The Neuquén-Cipolletti bridges are a series of four bridges that connect the cities of Neuquén and Cipolletti by spanning the Neuquén River, in Argentina. Three parallel ones, two road bridges and a railway bridge, were built on a former herd wrangling path. The fourth one was built upstream.

By 1899 the expansion of the Buenos Aires Great Southern Railway reached the station that later would become Cipolletti. To continue to the Neuquén Territory, a steel railway bridge was constructed in 1899–1902 to cross the Neuquén River. After the railroad connected Neuquén Station on the Confluencia settlement, the capital of the Territory was moved to the area, and the city of Neuquén founded in 1904.

Vehicular and pedestrian crossings of the river were made using boats and canoes at that time. By the 1930s, the service was overwhelmed by the growing population. The construction of a road bridge started in 1935, and the bridge opened in 1937. A second road bridge opened in 1997 to alleviate traffic congestion, while the third one is scheduled to open in 2015.

Background

In 1896, due to territorial disputes with Chile, the Argentinian Government commissioned the British-owned company Buenos Aires Great Southern Railway  to expand the existing railroad tracks  from the city of Bahía Blanca, in the Buenos Aires Province, to the Neuquén National Territory. The expansion of the railroad was aimed at facilitating the quick transport of troops and supplies to the Chilean border in case of war. By that time, the capital of the Neuquén National Territory was located in the city of Chos Malal. The journey between the city of Buenos Aires and the capital of the Territory lasted fifteen days, while the mail service arrived once a month.

On August 31, 1899, the expansion of the railroad reached the station Km. 1,190 (later renamed Limay Station).  The contract for the expansion, signed on March 16, 1896, established that the corporation F.C. Sud was to build a railroad bridge over the Neuquén River to continue the expansion of the tracks to the Neuquén National Territory. Across the river, the isolated Confluencia settlement was formed by Spanish and Italian immigrants. Living in a sparse group of houses,  the settlers' economy was sustained by the agriculture, while they depended on boat and canoe services to cross the river and remain communicated with the rest of the country.

Railway bridge

The construction of the railway bridge was assigned to engineer Karl Krag. Due to several floods of the river during the tests of the ground, Krag decided to build the bridge 100 meters upstream from the original planned point, on the margin of the river that was used as a cross by herd wranglers. An island located in the middle of the river was used to build the columns of the bridge while the water was low.

The steel sections, nuts, bolts and rivets were sent from Birmingham, United Kingdom. Unsuitable to be used for the abutment and foundations, the local rock and sand was replaced by material brought from Pichi Mahuida. A tide gauge was placed in Paso de los Indios to measure the changes on the Neuquén River. During the construction, the workers camped in tents on the left bank, while during the summer they moved to nearby bulrush shacks. The process marked the first use in Argentina of compressed air in construction, implemented to build the foundations with caissons.

The construction of the bridge was interrupted by three floods that destroyed tracks and makeshift bridges and interrupted traffic. On July 14, 1900, a telegraph message from Paso de los Indios warned the construction site of an upcoming major flood of the river. The machinery was moved, and the workers were evacuated to Limay Station. The highest part of the construction, two cylinders that held the airlock were visible due to a wave that rose above them.

The construction works were soon resumed, and by June 26, 1901, the completed bridge was load tested. On July 12, 1902, it was officially opened for traffic. The first passing locomotive, number 205, was operated by engineer Antonio Mazzarolo, accompanied by fireman Francesco Della Negra. Neuquén Station was built on the other side of the river, on the rural Confluencia settlement.

The same year, a resolution of the territorial disputes with Chile was negotiated with British intervention. By 1904, Governor Buquet Roldán decided to move the capital of the Neuquén Territory from Chos Malal to the Confluencia settlement, and founded Neuquén City. The move was leveraged by the railroad, that shortened travel time between the Territory and Buenos Aires to a maximum of three days.

Gallery

Old road bridge

Following the opening of the railway bridge, pedestrian cross was facilitated by the new structure, while boats and canoes still constituted the main crossing for pedestrian and vehicle transportation. As the population grew, by the 1930s the boat services became insufficient. After several complaints and stories published in the local press, Governor Carlos H. Rodríguez requested of the National Directorate of Roadways the construction of a road bridge. The structure was to be built next to the railway bridge, in the cross of the former herd wrangling path. The construction was assigned to the German-owned company GEOPÉ. The cornerstone was laid on May 26, 1935, by the new governor, Enrique Raimundo Pilotto. The construction deadline was set for April 15, 1937.

Two  sidewalks were built on each side with  guard rails. The abutment was built over four-armed concrete cylinders that reached a depth of  under the soil of the river. On Neuquén's side,  of land were removed to create a ten-metre wide roadway. The total cost of the works, and compensations for expropriations amounted to ARS$920,700.

By February 1937, the works initially directed by engineer Poenitz, and later continued by Lettner were finished two months ahead of schedule. Businessman Otto Max Neumann organized the opening ceremony. On February 20, 1937, the bridge was inaugurated by Governor of Neuquén Enrique Raimundo Pilotto and Cipolletti citizen Augusto Mengelle, who represented the absent Governor of Rio Negro. Two thousand citizens attended the opening, while a caravan of 300 cars crossed the bridge, following the car of Neuquén's Governor.

Gallery

Second and third road bridges
By the 1980s, as traffic grew, the two-way old bridge became insufficient for the traffic demand. Jams and saturation of the roads during the rush hour led the National Directorate of Roadways to include in its 1987 construction plans a new bridge, to be built parallel to the old bridge. Raúl Martínez, the president of the Directorate, visited the area to negotiate an agreement between the cities of Cipolletti and Neuquén. Both cities were unable to reach a mutual consensus on the location of the bridge, causing the National Directorate of Roadways to drop the project. In 1992, the two cities reached an agreement: to build a new road bridge between the existing one and the railroad bridge. The deal included the construction of toll booths for the new and old bridges, operated by the private company Caminos Del Valle S.A. The profits would be allocated to the finance of the construction of a third bridge upstream, to further alleviate traffic congestion. The project reconfigured part of the National Route 22, making a couplet of the two bridges, with the old bridge being limited to eastbound traffic (from Neuquén towards Cipolletti) and the new one limited to westbound traffic (from Cipolletti towards Neuquén). Construction works on the second road bridge started in 1995, and the structure opened to traffic in 1997.

By that time, Caminos del Valle failed to construct the third bridge, citing governmental bureaucratic reasons. The construction of the third bridge started in 2002, with the site located upstream from the three existing bridges. In 2013, the toll booths were removed as the contract of Caminos del Valle expired. The National Directorate of Roadways continued the works on the third bridge, and announced the opening for 2015.

Notable events

In March 1997, a series of demonstrations by education trade unions took place in the Neuquén Province. The Argentine Confederation of Education Workers (CTERA –) blocked the road bridges.  By  disrupting traffic, the blockade affected product supply to the city of Neuquén. At the time, the city produced ten percent of its consumed products, while the rest was transported to it in trucks. The 2,000-protester sitdown strike was broken on March 28, by a force of 300 men of the Provincial police and National Gendarmerie. Protesters were dispersed with tear gas and rubber bullets, with a toll of six wounded. Reacting to the incidents, CTERA launched a 24-hour national strike. Following the original block, throughout the years several protests in Neuquén city mirrored the act.

The use of the railway bridge was included in the route of the Tren del Valle, the reactivation of the inter-city passenger services. A cracked column of the bridge, which previously had a makeshift pallet reinforcement was repaired. The test of the bridge and tracks was performed on July 9, while the official opening of the line that initially will connect Neuquén and Cipoletti is planned for July 20.

References

Sources

External links

Neuquén Province
Río Negro Province
Buildings and structures in Neuquén Province
Buildings and structures in Río Negro Province
Bridges in Argentina
Railway bridges in Argentina
Bridges completed in 1902
Bridges completed in 1937
Bridges completed in 1997
Former toll bridges